Rosmantuzumab (INN; development code OMP-131R10) is a humanized monoclonal antibody designed for the treatment of cancer.

This drug was developed by OncoMed Pharmaceuticals.

References 

Monoclonal antibodies